Mr. Box Office is an American sitcom that debuted in first-run syndication in the United States on September 22, 2012. The show was created by Byron Allen and produced by his production company Entertainment Studios.

Plot
The series centers on movie star Marcus Jackson (Bill Bellamy), who ends up getting sentenced to community service after engaging in an altercation with a paparazzi, forcing Marcus to put his film career on hold. Due to the fact that he has a teacher's license (since he originally aspired to work as a teacher), the judge presiding in his case orders him to serve a six-month stint as a teacher for underprivileged high school kids in South Los Angeles. As a result, Marcus has to deal with his agent Bobby Gold (Jon Lovitz), constantly trying to get him back into film. However, he discovers that Marcus has decided to remain working at the school, and help improve his students. Marcus also deals with the mishaps of his best friends and roommates Tony (Tony T. Roberts) and Jamal (Alex Thomas).

Cast

Main cast
 Bill Bellamy – Marcus Jackson
 Jon Lovitz – Bobby Gold
 Alex Thomas – Jamal Tayor
 Tony T. Roberts – Tony "The Tiger"
 Vivica A. Fox – Cassandra Washington 
 Tim Meadows – Principal Theodore Martin
 Rick Fox – Andrew Thompson (episodes 1–23)
 Gary Busey – John Anderson (episodes 1–23)
 Essence Atkins – Samantha Owens
 Jeffrey Garcia – Freddy Lopez (season 2; recurring season 1)

Recurring cast
 Davi Santos – Carlos
 Nick Nervies – Milton
 Giovonnie Samuels – Camille
 Erinn Westbrook – Danielle
 Marcus T. Paulk – Jimmy
 Giselle Bonilla – Maria
 Tequan Richmond – Anthony

Special guest cast
 Keshia Knight Pulliam – Vanessa Owens (pilot episode)

Episodes

Production
Mr. Box Office is primarily syndicated to stations affiliated with The CW and MyNetworkTV and to independent stations for broadcast in weekend primetime timeslots. The series was originally slated to produce a total of 104 episodes, borrowing a similarly-formatted episode order as several sitcoms produced and distributed by Debmar-Mercury, such as Tyler Perry's House of Payne and Anger Management, in which the vast majority of the episodes would be produced in one season.

The series, which was sold as part of a two-hour comedy block with The First Family, was initially picked up by stations owned by Tribune Broadcasting, Weigel Broadcasting and CBS Television Stations. By May 2012, the program had been sold to stations covering approximately 85% of all U.S. markets. Production of the series slowed after the first 28 episodes aired. The series produced less than five new episodes per year in 2014 and 2015.

Syndication
On April 4, 2013, Centric acquired the cable syndication rights to all past and future episodes of The First Family, along with Mr. Box Office, with both series expected to begin airing on the channel starting April 19, 2013.

In Canada, the series aired on M3 and formerly aired on Comedy Gold. The show also airs on TheGrio in the United States.

References

External links
 
 

2010s American black sitcoms
2010s American high school television series
2010s American workplace comedy television series
2012 American television series debuts
2015 American television series endings
Television series about educators
Television shows set in Los Angeles
First-run syndicated television programs in the United States
English-language television shows
Television series by Entertainment Studios